Ice Wireless is a Canadian mobile network operator and telecommunications company that provides 4G/LTE mobility services, mobile broadband Internet, and fixed line telephone in Canada's northern territories: Yukon, the Northwest Territories, Nunavut, and Nunavik, Quebec. The company's corporate headquarters are located in Markham, Ontario.

History
Ice Wireless was launched in 2005 to serve rural and remote communities in Northern Canada. The network was the first GSM system in Northern Canada, originally designed as a "small cell" system that could be scaled down and economically deployed to rural and remote communities. Due to the scalability of its technology, Ice Wireless could offer mobility service in locations that could not be economically reached by larger telecommunications companies. Ice Wireless was the first to launch mobility service in Inuvik, Aklavik and Behchoko (Rae-Edzo) in the Northwest Territories. As customers increased, Ice Wireless expanded service to include Yellowknife, Northwest Territories.

In 2012, Ice Wireless announced a $12.4 million network upgrade to roll out 3G/4G Evolved High Speed Packet Access (HSPA+) across the three Canadian territories. As part of this upgrade, Ice Wireless launched a full range of telecommunications services, including 3G/4G mobility services, mobile broadband Internet, and fixed line telephone. Ice Wireless also announced a strategic partnership with Iristel, the largest competitive local exchange carrier (CLEC) in Canada and the first CLEC to enter Northern Canada.

In 2013, Ice Wireless became the first mobile network operator to launch 3G/4G services to Iqaluit, Nunavut. These services were launched using SES’ AMC-9 satellite. In 2017, Ice Wireless became the first mobile operator to launch LTE service to Iqaluit, Nunavut.

In 2019, Ice Wireless launched 3G LTE service in Kuujjuaq, Quebec and Quaqtaq, Quebec as part of a larger roll-out to all 14 communities of the Nunavik region of Northern Quebec.

The Ice Wireless network now extends across Canada's North and includes the Yukon, Northwest Territories, Nunavut and the Nunavik region of Northern Quebec.

Services
 4G/LTE Mobility Services
 Mobile Broadband Internet
 Fixed Line Telephone

Retail stores
Ice Wireless operates its own corporate retail stores, and also conducts business through a network of agents that operate in each local market. Ice Wireless provides 24/7 customer care and technical support for its customers, as well as 9-1-1 service.

Network
As a Mobile Network Operator (MNO) Ice Wireless owns and operates communication towers, facilities and radio access network equipment in all three Canadian territories.

Ice Wireless provides UMTS wireless services with HSPA+ for data, using its licenses on the 850 MHz/1900 MHz frequency band, also known as Personal Communications Service (PCS).

Ice Wireless is a member of the GSM Association (GSMA).

Coverage
Ice Wireless offers 4G LTE network coverage in Yukon, Northwest Territories, Nunavut, and Northern Quebec.

Roaming
Ice Wireless customers may use smartphones and devices across Canada, the United States and internationally through the company's network of roaming partnerships, including Bell, Rogers Wireless, Telus, Vidéotron Mobile, and AT&T.

Smartphones
As of 2020 Ice Wireless offers the following smartphones for use on its network.

 Apple IPhone (several models)
 Samsung Galaxy (several models)

ICE home phone services
Ice Wireless offers the ICE home phone service, which provides customers with a home telephone line.

The Ice home phone is a small wireless device and provides telephone service to corded or cordless home telephones. The Ice home phone uses the Ice Wireless cellular network to operate and can be used anywhere in a customer's house or office that there is a wireless signal. The ICE Home Phone needs only be powered; it does not require the use of a home phone wall jack like traditional home phone service. The ICE home phone comes with a set of three VTech cordless phones at time of purchase.

Mobile Broadband Services
Ice Wireless offers two mobile broadband products that provide high speed internet service, wireless and home Internet. The wireless service comes with either an Aircard 763S that allows up to 10 Wi-Fi devices or a BEC 6300 modem, both with 4G/LTE download speeds. Ice Wireless also offers home Internet plans.

Relationship with Iristel
In 2012, Ice Wireless established a strategic partnership with Iristel, Canada's largest CLEC and VoIP service provider.

See also
 Bell Canada
 Northwestel
 List of Canadian mobile phone companies

References

External links

Mobile phone companies of Canada
Telecommunications companies established in 2005
Companies based in Markham, Ontario